Clypeolum is a genus of freshwater snails or brackish snails that have an operculum, aquatic gastropod molluscs in the family Neritidae, the nerites.

Genera
 Clypeolum latissimum (Broderip, 1833)
 Clypeolum owenianum (W. Wood, 1828)
Species brought into synonymy
 Clypeolum planissimum Mousson, 1869: synonym of Neritona planissima (Mousson, 1869) (basionym)

References 

 Récluz, C., 1850. Notice sur le genre Nerita et sur le S.-G. Neritina, avec le Catalogue synonymique des Neritines. Journal de Conchyliologie 1: 131-164
 Fischer-Piette, E., 1950. Listes des types décrits dans le Journal de Conchyliologie et conservés dans la collection de ce journal. Journal de Conchyliologie 90: 8-23
 Eichhorst T.E. (2016). Neritidae of the world. Volume 1. Harxheim: Conchbooks. 695 pp

External links 
 Récluz C.A. (1842). Observations sur la Neritina (Neripteron) gigas, Lesson. Revue Zoologique par la Société Cuvierienne. 5: 234-236.

Neritidae
Gastropod genera